Jalpapur   is a village development committee in Sunsari District in the Kosi Zone of south-eastern Nepal.It is bounded by satterjhora in the east, Gautampur in the south and Ramnagar in southwest and Babia in the North Respectively. At the time of the 1991 Nepal census it had a population of 4256 people living in 663 individual households.

References

Populated places in Sunsari District